Kolilakkam is a 1981 Malayalam-language action thriller film, written and directed by P. N. Sundaram, and starring Jayan. The film was a box office hit. The movie was a remake of the 1965 Hindi film Waqt.

Premise 
Three brothers, who were separated at birth, face several trials and tribulations when they try to make an effort to reunite.

Cast 
Jayan
Madhu
Sukumaran
M.G. Soman
K. P. Ummer
Balan K. Nair
K. R. Vijaya
Sumalatha
M. N. Nambiar
Sankaradi
Sreelatha Namboothiri
Kunjan
Meena(Malayalam actress)
K. P. A. C. Sunny
P. K. Abraham
T. P. Madhavan

Production 

On 16 November 1980, Jayan was killed in an accident on the set of Kolilakkam. The climax scene of the film was being filmed in Sholavaram, near Chennai, Tamil Nadu. Jayan performed his own stunt that involved him boarding an airborne helicopter from a moving motorbike. Jayan insisted on another take as he was not satisfied. During the take, the pilot lost control and crashed the helicopter while Jayan was hanging below, leading to his death.

References

External links 

1980s Malayalam-language films
1980s disaster films
1981 films
Indian drama films
Films scored by M. S. Viswanathan
Indian disaster films
Malayalam remakes of Hindi films